The Marines Who Never Returned (aka Marines Are Gone) is a 1963 South Korean film directed by Lee Man-hee. It was released in the U.S. in 1966 as Marine Battleground. For this film, Lee was given the Best Director award at the third Grand Bell Awards ceremony in 1964. The film was also given the awards for Best Sound and Best Cinematography.

Synopsis
During the Korean War, a squad of Marines from the South battle Chinese forces in the North, and are killed off one by one. At the beginning of the film, a young girl Young-hui and her mother desperately try to run for their lives from the Chinese soldiers. The girl's mother is shot dead but soldiers rescue Young-Hui in time and they immediately hide her from their higher-ranking commanders. Young-Hui is then instructed to continue hiding when she is delivered to their camp, out of fear that the general will send her to an orphanage.

The first half of the film centers on the Marines focusing on entertainment and looking after the young girl to alleviate the burden of the war. Afterwards, the Marines depart Young-Hui and head to the mountains to go into heated combat to confront the People's Volunteer Army.

Notes

Bibliography

1963 films
1960s Korean-language films
Korean War films
South Korean war drama films
Films directed by Lee Man-hee (director)
Films about the Republic of Korea Marine Corps